Marten Creek may refer to several creeks in the United States of America:

Official name
Marten Creek (Denali Borough), Alaska
Marten Creek (Fairbanks North Star Borough), Alaska
Marten Creek (Wrangell Borough), Alaska
Marten Creek (634840N, 1532500W, Yukon-Koyukuk Census Area), Alaska
Marten Creek (675900N, 1420400W, Yukon-Koyukuk Census Area), Alaska
Marten Creek (Chandalar River tributary), Yukon-Koyukuk Census Area, Alaska
Marten Creek (Colorado)
Marten Creek (Boise County), Idaho
Marten Creek (Clearwater County), Idaho
Marten Creek (Idaho County), Idaho
Marten Creek (Shoshone County), Idaho
Marten Creek (Michigan)
Marten Creek (Little Thompson River tributary), Sanders County, Montana
Marten Creek (Noxon Reservoir tributary), Sanders County, Montana
Marten Creek (Brice Creek Tributary), Lane County, Oregon 
Marten Creek (McKenzie River Tributary), Lane County, Oregon 
Marten Creek (Marion County), Oregon
Marten Creek (King County), Washington
Marten Creek (Skagit County), Washington
Marten Creek (Snohomish County), Washington
Marten Creek (Lincoln County), Wyoming
Marten Creek (Sublette County), Wyoming

Alternate name 
The following features are also known as Marten Creek in addition to their official names:
Grave Creek (Idaho)
Lightning Creek (Idaho)
West Fork Creek, Idaho